Ilikena Vudogo (born 3 November 1998) is a Fijian rugby union player who plays for the  in Super Rugby. His playing position is centre or wing. He was named in the Rebels squad for the 2021 Super Rugby AU season. He had previously represented Fiji U20s and also spent time as a development player at the Brisbane Broncos.

Super Rugby statistics

Reference list

External links
itsrugby.co.uk profile

1998 births
Fijian rugby union players
Living people
Rugby union centres
Rugby union wings
Melbourne Rebels players